Banketten is a 1948 Swedish drama film which is directed by Hasse Ekman.

Plot summary
Jacob Cotten is just about to turn 60 years old and his prominent family will hold a banquet in his honour to celebrate the occasion. At this time his youngest son announce that he will not inherit his father's business and money, because he is a communist and want to make it on his own.

Cottens daughter lives in a distorted marriage full of violence, arguments, abuse, and alcohol. The eldest son lives like a spoiled parasite on his rich family and has no intent to change his ways. How will the banquet go and who will inherit the business and the fortune, that both created and destroyed the Cotten family?

Cast
Ernst Eklund as Jacob Cotten, banker 
Elsa Carlsson as Agnes, his wife
Sture Lagerwall as Pierre Cotten, their son
Eva Henning as Victoria "Vica" Stenbrott, Jacobs and Agnes daughter 
Hasse Ekman as Hugo Stenbrott, Vicas husband
Sven Lindberg as Ivar, Jacobs and Agnes son, student
Birger Malmsten as Rex Lundgren, medicine student 
Hilda Borgström as aunt Alberta 
Jan Molander as Sixten, friend of Vica and Hugos 
Barbro Flodquist as Kate, friend of Vica and Hugos 
Ragnar Arvedson as staff at NK
Solveig Lagström as Siri, maid at Vica and Hugos

External links

1948 films
Films directed by Hasse Ekman
1940s Swedish-language films
Swedish drama films
1948 drama films
Swedish black-and-white films
1940s Swedish films